Tomioka may refer to:
Tomioka, Fukushima, a town in Fukushima Prefecture
Tomioka Station, a railway station
Tomioka, Gunma, a city in Gunma Prefecture
Tomioka silk mill
Tomioka Castle
  (born 1964), professional shogi player
 (1932–2007), Japanese cyclist
, fictional character from the manga Demon Slayer: Kimetsu no Yaiba

Japanese-language surnames